Andrew Breiner (born July 9, 1984) is an American football coach who is the assistant quarterbacks coach for the Jacksonville Jaguars of the National Football League (NFL). He previously served as the offensive coordinator and quarterbacks coach at Florida International University (FIU) in 2021 and pass game analyst for the Philadelphia Eagles in 2020. 

Breiner previously served as the head coach at Fordham University and also served as an assistant coach at the Mississippi State University, University of Connecticut, Allegheny College and Lock Haven University of Pennsylvania.

Early years
Breiner was born on July 9, 1984 in Dallas, Texas and grew up in Hummelstown, Pennsylvania. Breiner played college football at the Lock Haven University of Pennsylvania and he was a four-year letter winner with the Bald Eagles as a wide receiver and also played special teams. Breiner won a National Football Foundation Scholar-Athlete Award from the Central Pennsylvania Chapter of the NFF for his accomplishments athletically, academically and in the community. In 2006, Breiner earned a degree in health and physical education from Lock Haven University.

Coaching career

Lock Haven
In 2006, Breiner began his coaching career as the wide receivers at the Lock Haven University of Pennsylvania, his alma mater.

Allegheny
In 2007, Breiner joined Allegheny College as their wide receivers coach. In 2008, Breiner transitioned to quarterbacks coach.

Connecticut
In 2009, Breiner was hired as a graduate assistant, quarterbacks and wide receivers coach at the University of Connecticut. In 2011, Breiner was named a graduate assistant, quarterbacks and running backs coach.

Fordham
In 2012, Breiner joined Fordham University as their offensive coordinator and quarterbacks coach under head coach Joe Moorhead. 

In 2016, Breiner was named the head coach at Fordham University, succeeding Moorhead.

On December 5, 2017, Breiner resigned as head coach of the Rams.

Mississippi State
Following his resignation as head coach at Fordham University, Breiner was named the passing game coordinator and quarterbacks coach at Mississippi State University, reuniting with head coach Joe Moorhead.

Philadelphia Eagles
On February 5, 2020, Breiner was hired by the Philadelphia Eagles as a pass game analyst under head coach Doug Pederson.

FIU
In 2021, Breiner was hired as the offensive coordinator and quarterbacks coach at Florida International University (FIU).

Jacksonville Jaguars
On February 17, 2022, Breiner was hired by the Jacksonville Jaguars as their assistant quarterbacks coach under head coach Doug Pederson.

Head coaching record

College

Personal life
Breiner is married to his wife, Kelly. They have a daughter and son together.

References

External links
Jacksonville Jaguars profile

1984 births
Living people
American football wide receivers
Allegheny Gators football coaches
FIU Panthers coaches
Fordham Rams football coaches
Jacksonville Jaguars coaches
Lock Haven Bald Eagles football coaches
Lock Haven Bald Eagles football players
Mississippi State Bulldogs football coaches
Philadelphia Eagles coaches
UConn Huskies football coaches